SS Rotterdam may refer to one of seven ships of the Holland America Line:

 , rigged for steam and sail; wrecked 26 September 1883
 , former British Empire, later Edam III (1895); scrapped 1899
 , scrapped in 1940
 , retired from Holland America Line in 1997
  (1996), sold by Holland America Line to Fred. Olsen Cruise Lines and sailing under the name  since July 2021.
 , a cruise ship which entered service in October 2021, third of Holland-America's Pinnacle class.

Ship names